Teenage Zombies is a 1959 science fiction horror film written, produced, edited and directed by Jerry Warren, and starring Katherine Victor, Don Sullivan, Chuck Niles and Warren's then-wife and production manager Brianne Murphy. Warren wrote the screenplay under his pen name Jacques Lecoutier (which he frequently misspelled in the credits). Film historian Bill Warren wrote "This dreadful, leaden and depressingly cheap film does have one unusual aspect... it was actually made by Jerry Warren in its entirety."

The plot follows a group of teenagers who are marooned on an island inhabited by a female mad scientist, her pet gorilla and a zombie slave named Ivan. She traps the youths in a cage down in her laboratory, plotting to use them as subjects for her zombie-making experimentation, so she can test out a drug she is working on for an unnamed foreign nation.

Although the credits include a 1957 copyright statement for G.B.M. Productions, the film was never registered for copyright, rendering it in the public domain.

Plot 
While taking their boat out for some water-skiing, a quartet of teens named Reg (Don Sullivan), Skip (Paul Pepper), Julie (Mitzie Albertson), and Pam (Brianne Murphy) accidentally discover an island run by a mad scientist named Doctor Myra (Katherine Victor) who, backed by foreign agents from "the East",  intends to turn everyone in the United States into mindlessly obedient zombies.

The teenagers are captured by the hulking, bearded zombie Ivan (Chuck Niles) and imprisoned in cages down in Myra's basement, but the boys manage to escape, planning to find a way off the island and then come back to rescue the girls.  When a couple of their young friends arrive with the local sheriff to save them, he turns out to be in league with Myra and has been supplying her with victims for her experiments.

A complicated fight scene serves as the climax, in which a previously zombified gorilla arrives just in time to attack Myra's henchmen and allow the teens to escape.  They find Myra attempting to steal their boat and manage to capture her for the police. After they are safely back on the mainland and the proper authorities informed, it is implied that the teens will receive a reward for discovering the island and will have an audience with the President of the United States.

Cast 
 Don Sullivan as Reg
 Katherine Victor as Dr. Myra
 Steve Conte as Whorf
 Brianne Murphy (Bri in the credits) as Pam
 Mitch Evans (aka Evan Hayworth) as the Gorilla
 Chuck Niles as Ivan the Zombie
 Paul Pepper as Skip
 J.L.D. Morrison as Brandt
 Mitzie Albertson as Julie
 Jay Hawk as Morrie
 Mike Concannon as Sheriff
 Nan Green as Dotty
 Don Neeley as Maj. Coleman

Production

Actress Katharine Victor said Jerry Warren "discovered" her when they met by chance as he was preparing Teenage Zombies in mid-1957. She was surprised that he gave her almost no directorial help while they were making the film. Evan Hayworth (listed in the cast as Mitch Evans) said he played the gorilla wearing a cheap rental costume.

Famed L.A. disc jockey Chuck Niles appeared as Ivan the Zombie in the film. He later said ""I was just walking around like Frankenstein, that's all, no lines, just 'gluergugluergu,' and I'm pretty good at that.....the movie was just terrible". Bruce Eder of Rovi wrote that lead actor Don Sullivan also appeared in two other 1950's cult films, The Giant Gila Monster and The Monster of Piedras Blancas.
 	
The film's poster promised "Young Pawns Thrust into Pulsating Cages of Horror in a Sadistic Experiment", but film historian Bill Warren said "It's doubtful anyone expected much more than the dreck they got....it's not just bad, it's terrible".

Release
While the American Film Institute states that the film was released in April 1960 at the same time as The Incredible Petrified World, Bill Warren in his book Keep Watching the Skies states that the film was released in December, 1959 on a double bill with The Incredible Petrified World.

References

External links 

 
 
 
 

1960 films
1960 horror films
1960s science fiction horror films
American black-and-white films
American independent films
American science fiction horror films
American zombie films
Films directed by Jerry Warren
Films set on islands
Mad scientist films
1960 independent films
1960s English-language films
1950s English-language films
1950s American films
1960s American films